Thea Kyvåg (born 9 January 2004) is a Norwegian footballer who plays as a forward for West Ham.

Career

Kyvåg started her career with Norwegian fourth tier side Gjelleråsen. Before the 2020 season, she signed for LSK in the Norwegian top flight. In 2022, Kyvåg signed for English club West Ham.

She became a prolific youth international, especially for Norway U19, taking part in the 2022 UEFA Women's Under-19 Championship.

Personal life

She is the daughter of handball player Sahra Hausmann.

References

External links
 

Norway women's youth international footballers
Living people
2004 births
Norwegian women's footballers
Expatriate sportspeople in England
Women's association footballers not categorized by position